Gendaria is a Thana of Dhaka District in the Division of Dhaka, Bangladesh. The name is a portmanteau of original name Grand Area, still found in deeds prior to 1950s.

Educational institutions

The only college in the upazila is Fazlul Hoq Mohila College, an honors level one.

According to Banglapedia, Bangladesh Bank Ideal High School, Gandaria High School, Moniza Rahman Girls' High School, and Narinda Government High School are notable secondary schools.

The madrasa education system includes one fazil and one kamil madrasa.

See also
Upazilas of Bangladesh
Districts of Bangladesh
Divisions of Bangladesh

References

Old Dhaka
Thanas of Dhaka